The now-defunct Prydniprovskyi Chemical Plant (Prydniprovskyi khimichnyi zavod, PKhZ, also PChP) in the city of Kamianske, Ukraine, processed uranium ore for the Soviet nuclear program from 1948 through 1991, preparing yellowcake.

Its processing wastes are now stored in nine open-air dumping grounds containing about 36 million tonnes of sand-like low-radioactive residue, occupying an area of 2.5 million square meters. The sites, improperly constructed from the very beginning, have been abandoned by the industry long ago and remain in very poor condition. The top concern is the dumps’ closeness to both the large Dnipro River and city residential areas. According to government experts, the dams separating the grounds from soil water are already leaking, causing the pollution of Dnipro basin. It is believed that further deterioration of the dams, irrespective of any outer accidents, may cause a devastating radioactive mudslide. The Ukrainian government is now tightening control over the grounds and seeking international aid in projects aimed at securing and the gradual re-processing of the PHZ wastes. Recently, the International Atomic Energy Agency has evaluated the condition of the sites and is considering dispatching a major observation and aid mission to Kamianske.

From 1946 to 1972, the company was engaged in uranium enrichment (production of its nitrous oxide) - the plant processed 65% of uranium ores in the Soviet Union. Attempts to recycle fuel elements began in 1974, but due to the growing number of oncological diseases in the city, this idea was abandoned.

The isolated dump grounds (about nine altogether, at a depth of 3 m) of the former plant are now located in different parts of the city and operated by the purposely-created "Barrier" State Enterprise - with an obscure-meaning new name that has yet to be widely known. That is why the sites, the company, and the whole problem is still commonly referred to as the "Prydniprovskyi Chemical Plant (PKhZ) wastes".

In 1964 the first treatment facilities appeared at the enterprise. In 2003, the Cabinet of Ministers approved an 11-year program on "bringing hazardous facilities of the Prydniprovskyi Chemical Plant to an environmentally safe state and ensuring protection of the population from the harmful effects of ionizing radiation".

See also
Dnipro reservoir cascade

References

Environment of Ukraine
Nuclear technology in Ukraine
Kamianske
Radioactive waste
Chemical engineering
Chemical companies of Ukraine
Nuclear technology in the Soviet Union
Chemical companies of the Soviet Union
Government-owned companies of Ukraine